Alice Hechy (born Alice Scheel; 21 July 1893 – 26 May 1973) was a German stage and film actress and singer (soprano).

Selected filmography

Bibliography
 Eisner, Lotte H., The Haunted Screen: Expressionism in the German Cinema and the Influence of Max Reinhardt. University of California Press, 2008.

External links

1893 births
1973 deaths
German sopranos
German stage actresses
German film actresses
German silent film actresses
People from Anklam
20th-century German actresses